The Patent Law Treaty (PLT) is a treaty signed on 1 June 2000 in Geneva, Switzerland, by 53 States and the European Patent Organisation (an intergovernmental organization). It entered into force on April 28, 2005. It aims at harmonizing and streamlining formal procedures such as the requirements to obtain a filing date for a patent application, the form and content of a patent application, and representation. The treaty "does not establish a uniform procedure for all parties to the PLT but leaves parties free to require fewer or more user-friendly requirements than those provided in the PLT." As of February 2023, the PLT had 43 contracting states.

History

France  
Prior to the entry into force of the treaty in France, a bill was submitted on 14 January 2009 at the French Senate proposing the ratification of the PLT by France. In March 2009, a report from French Senator Rachel Mazuir recommended the ratification of the PLT, as soon as possible, by France. On 24 July 2009, the government was authorized to ratify the PLT. The PLT then entered into force for France on 5 January 2010.

United States  
The Treaty was ratified by the United States on 18 September 2013. Parts of the PLT were applied to U.S. patent law with the passage of the Patent Law Treaties Implementation Act of 2012.

Mexico
Article 20(7)(3) of the proposed new NAFTA, in December 2019, stated that "Each Party shall give due consideration to ratifying or acceding to the PLT, or, in the alternative, shall adopt or maintain procedural standards consistent with the objective of the PLT".

See also
Paris Convention for the Protection of Industrial Property
Patent Cooperation Treaty (PCT)
Substantive Patent Law Treaty (SPLT)
European Convention relating to the Formalities required for Patent Applications (1953)

References

Further reading

External links
Patent Law Treaty in the WIPO Lex database – official website of WIPO.
 The full text of the Patent Law Treaty 

Law Treaty, Patent
World Intellectual Property Organization treaties
Treaties concluded in 2000
Treaties of Moldova
Treaties of Kyrgyzstan
Treaties of Slovenia
Treaties of Slovakia
Treaties of Nigeria
Treaties of Ukraine
Treaties of Estonia
Treaties of Denmark
Treaties of Croatia
Treaties of Romania
Treaties of Bahrain
Treaties of Finland
Treaties of the United Kingdom
Treaties of Uzbekistan
Treaties of Oman
Treaties of Sweden
Treaties of Hungary
Treaties of Switzerland
Treaties of Russia
Treaties of Liechtenstein
Treaties of France
Treaties entered into force in 2005
Treaties of North Macedonia
Treaties of Albania
Treaties of Latvia
Treaties of Serbia
Treaties of the Netherlands
Treaties of Montenegro
Treaties of Lithuania
Treaties of Kazakhstan
Treaties of Bosnia and Herzegovina
Treaties of Ireland
Treaties of Saudi Arabia
Treaties of the United States
Treaties of Armenia
Treaties of Japan
Treaties of Belarus
Treaties of Liberia
Treaties of North Korea
Treaties of Antigua and Barbuda
Treaties of Canada
2000 in Switzerland
Treaties extended to Greenland
Treaties extended to the Faroe Islands
Treaties extended to the Isle of Man
Treaties extended to the Netherlands Antilles